Bouvieromyiini is a tribe of horse flies in the family Tabanidae.

Genera
Aegophagamyia Austen, 1912
Eucompsa Enderlein, 1922
Gressittia Philip & Mackerras, 1960
Merycomyia Hine, 1912
Paulianomyia Oldroyd, 1957
Phibalomyia Taylor, 1920
Pseudopangonia Ricardo, 1915
Pseudotabanus Ricardo, 1915
Rhigioglossa Wiedemann, 1828
Thaumastomyia Philip & Mackerras, 1960

References

Tabanidae
Brachycera tribes
Taxa named by Eugène Séguy